Piotr Azikiewicz (born 21 April 1995) is a Polish professional footballer who plays as a left-back for IV liga club Prochowiczanka Prochowice.

Career

Club

Azikiewicz started his career with Zagłębie Lubin.

He made his debut for Zagłębie in a 1–0 defeat to Cracovia Kraków on 23 August 2013.

International career
He also played at the 2012 UEFA European Under-17 Football Championship.

Honours
Górnik Polkowice
II liga: 2020–21

Miedź Legnica
I liga: 2021–22

References

External links 
 
 

1995 births
People from Legnica
Sportspeople from Lower Silesian Voivodeship
Living people
Polish footballers
Poland youth international footballers
Association football midfielders
Zagłębie Lubin players
Rozwój Katowice players
Kotwica Kołobrzeg footballers
Górnik Polkowice players
Miedź Legnica players
Wisła Puławy players
Ekstraklasa players
I liga players
II liga players
III liga players